Mitchell Lake or Lake Mitchell can refer to:

 Mitchell Lake (Ontario), Canada
 Mitchell Lake (San Antonio), Texas
 Mitchell Lake (Apica River), lake crossed by Apica River in Lac-Jacques-Cartier, La Côte-de-Beaupré Regional County Municipality, Capitale-Nationale, Quebec, Canada
 Lake Mitchell (Michigan), United States